Stephen Hugh Garvey (born 22 November 1973 in Stalybridge, Cheshire) is an English former professional footballer.

Garvey, a winger, began his career as a trainee with Dario Gradi's Crewe Alexandra in 1991. He remained at Gresty Road for seven years, making 107 league appearances and scoring eight goals for the Railwaymen.

In 1998, he moved to Blackpool on a free transfer. In three years at the seaside, he made only 17 appearances, scoring once. He was released in May 2001.

He moved into non-league football in 2001 with Northwich Victoria, on another free. He left the Cheshire club four years later after making just short of 150 appearances and scoring fifteen goals returning to his native Tameside to play first for Stalybrige Celtic then Ashton United.

Honours
with Crewe Alexandra
Football League Second Division play-off final winner: 1997

References

External links

1973 births
Living people
People from Stalybridge
English footballers
Crewe Alexandra F.C. players
Chesterfield F.C. players
Blackpool F.C. players
Northwich Victoria F.C. players
Stalybridge Celtic F.C. players
Ashton United F.C. players
English Football League players
Association football midfielders